Southport Transit Centre is on Scarborough Street in Southport, Queensland, Australia. Opened on 29 November 2000 by the Hon. Steve Bredhauer MP, the $6 million Southport Transit Centre Project was a joint partnership between Queensland Transport and the Southport Workers’ Club.

It provides services for private and charter coaches on interstate and intrastate routes.

See also

Transport on the Gold Coast, Queensland

External links
Gold Coast City Council -  Southport Transit Centre

Buildings and structures on the Gold Coast, Queensland
Public transport on the Gold Coast, Queensland
Bus stations in Gold Coast City
Southport, Queensland